Scott O. Brown (born 1975) is an American writer, letterer, publisher, editor, and production manager. Brown has been responsible for publishing top-tier creators like Amin Amat, Mal Jones, Drew Gilbert, Antony Johnston, Steven Grant, and Jamie Delano.

During Cyberosia's history, he oversaw the development of the supernatural pulp thriller Frightening Curves, the critically acclaimed short story collection Aporiatica, along with Overtime and Rosemary's Backpack.

Aporiatica Gn (2001)
2020 Visions Hc (2004)
Cathedral Child: Texas Steampunk Gn (2002)
Clockwork Angels Tpb (2002)
Damned Tpb (2003)
Dark Gate Gn (2004)
Death Valley Gn (2005)
Johnny Nemo Tpb (2002)
Overtime Gn (2002)
Passenger Gn (2004)
Popimage Vol. 1: The Time Of Change Gn (2002)
Rosemary's Backpack Gn (2002)
Second Soul Gn (2003)
Spookshow Gn (2003)
They Do Not Die Gn (2011)
District Comics: An Unconventional History of Washington, DC Gn (2012)
Monstrology Gn (2013)

Published by Platinum Studios, Brown's graphic novel Nightfall was inspired by Joss Whedon's Buffy and Angel television shows, and tells the story of industrious, right-wing survivalist David Paxton, who is sent to a tough Texas prison, that is run by vampires.

Brown is also the letterer behind the Zuda series High Moon, Box 13 at ComiXology.com, and many Platinum Studios comics including Cowboys & Aliens, Red Mantis, and several others. He is also the writer and letterer of his self-published titles They Do Not Die, and Red Ice with artist Horacio Lalia.

Unproduced film adaptation
In 2007, it was also announced that an adaptation of Brown's graphic novel Nightfall was to be James Wan next film after Death Sentence. The plot involves the events that take place after a criminal is sent to a Texas prison run by vampires. However, nothing materialized and Wan lost the rights to the film.

External links
They Do Not Die
Red Ice
"'Nightfall'"
"'Atlantis Rising'"

Footnotes

American comics writers
American bloggers
1975 births
Living people
Writers from Alabama